Braeburn is an apple cultivar.

Braeburn can also refer to:

Places

United States
Braeburn, Houston, a neighbourhood of Houston, Texas

Canada
Braeburn, a locality in Saddle Hills County, Alberta
Braeburn Lodge, Yukon

Schools
Braeburn Schools, a Kenyan company that directs a group of private schools
Braeburn Mombasa International School, a private school in Mombasa, Kenya
Braeburn Junior School, a school in Thistletown, a neighbourhood of Toronto, Ontario, Canada

Others
Braeburn, a character from My Little Pony: Friendship is Magic
Braeburn Capital, a subsidiary of Apple, Inc.